Maiden's Cheek is a 1959 Greek comedy film directed by Alekos Sakellarios, literally translated as "The beating came from paradise".

Cast 
 Aliki Vougiouklaki - Liza Papastavrou
 Dimitris Papamichael - Panos Floras
 Christos Tsaganeas - School Master
 Dionysis Papagiannopoulos - Makrydakis
 Orestis Makris - Gym Master Gikas
 Marika Krevata - Mrs. Papastavrou
 Melpo Zarokosta - Popi Alexiou
 Giorgos Gavriilidis - Mavromatis
 Niki Linardou - Xanthopoulou
 Katerina Gogou - Lazarou
 Anna Mantzourani - Polychronopoulou
 Thodoros Moridis - Themistocles Papastavrou
 Mary Metaxa - cook

External links 

Greek black-and-white films
Films scored by Manos Hatzidakis
1950s Greek-language films